Abtahi is a surname. Notable people with the surname include:

Mehdi Abtahi (born 1963), Iranian footballer and manager
Milad Abtahi (born 1992), Iranian footballer
Mohammad-Ali Abtahi (born 1958), Iranian theologian, scholar, and pro-democracy activist
Omid Abtahi (born 1979), Iranian-American actor